Henri Desroche (12 April 19141 June 1994) was a French sociologist. His writings center on the sociology of religion and cooperative systems and movements. He was a priest in the Dominican Order.

Life
Henri Desroche was born 12 April 1914 in Roanne, France. He attended the Collège Saint-Pierre of Villemontais before entering the seminary in the diocese of Lyon. He joined the Dominicans in Angers in October 1934. There he took the name of Henri-Charles and added the "s" to his name, becoming Henri-Charles Desroches. He completed his theological studies in Chambery and was ordained a priest in Annecy in July 1936. On September 30, 1977 Desroche received an honorary doctorate from the Faculty of 
Theology  at Uppsala University, Sweden.

Works by Desroche
 The American Shakers: From Neo-Christianity to Presocialism (1971)
 Jacob and the Angel: An Essay in Sociologies of Religion (1973) (Trans. of Sociologies religieuses [1968])
 The Sociology of Hope (1979)

Notes

References

External links
 "Desroche, Henri" at Hartford Institute for Religion Research, (Hartford Seminary).
  "Henri Desroche (1914-1994)" at Cahiers d'Études Bastidiennes.
   by Cercle Condorcet de Roanne.


1914 births
1994 deaths
French sociologists
People from Roanne
French Dominicans
20th-century French Roman Catholic priests
French male writers
20th-century French male writers